The Xiaomi MIX 4 is an Android smartphone launched on 10 August 2021 by Chinese company Xiaomi. As of 2021, it is the latest successor to the Xiaomi Mi MIX product line and follows its immediate predecessor the Xiaomi Mi MIX 3 which launched in 2018. The MIX 4 is the first device from Xiaomi to offer an under-display selfie camera, following the Axon 20 5G and Axon 30 from ZTE; Oppo also previewed the technology a week before the MIX 4's release.

Design 

Front panel made from Corning Gorilla Glass Victus. The back is made up of ceramic.

The camera unit design is similar to Xiaomi Mi 11 Ultra.

On the bottom side there is a USB-C port, speaker, microphone and dual SIM tray. On the top side, there is an additional microphone, IR blaster and second speaker. On the right side, there is a volume rocker and power button.

Xiaomi MIX 4 is available in 3 colors: Ceramic Black, Ceramic White and Ceramic Gray.

Hardware

Chipset 
The MIX 4 is the first phone to use the Qualcomm Snapdragon 888+ SoC. It has an overclocked Kryo 680 Prime (Cortex-X1) performance core which runs at 2.99 GHz compared to 2.84 GHz on the 888.

References

Android (operating system) devices
Mobile phones introduced in 2021
Mobile phones with multiple rear cameras
Mobile phones with 8K video recording
Phablets
Mobile phones with infrared transmitter
Flagship smartphones
Xiaomi smartphones